The 2010 Tallahassee mayoral election was held on August 24, 2010, to elect the Mayor of Tallahassee, Florida.

Incumbent mayor John Marks was reelected for a 3rd term with 51.10% of the vote. He primarily faced a challenge from Steve Stewart, founder and editor of the Tallahassee Reports.

Results

References

2010
2010 Florida elections
2010 United States mayoral elections